"Oh La La La" (originally spelled as "O La La La" ) is a 1981 song by Belgian rock band TC Matic. Written by Arno Hintjens, Ferre Baelen and Rudy Cloet, it appeared on their album TC Matic (1981) and was also released as a single, with "Dancing Thoughts" as the B-side. "Oh La La La" became a huge club hit, concert favorite and is still considered both the band as well as Arno Hintjens' signature song.   

In 2012 the song was covered by Zita Swoon.

Charts

References

External links
 Discogs page

TC Matic songs
1981 songs
1981 singles
English-language Belgian songs